The Peruvian center for international studies (CEPEI), was founded in March 1983 and is an institution dedicated to promote, organize and realize investigation projects, analysis, consulting, and publications of international affairs.

Its members are renowned in the field of law and international relations, and some of them have become foreign affair ministers of the Peruvian government.

Founders 
 Roberto Dañino Zapata
 Miguel de Althaus
 Fernando de Trazegnies
 Eduardo Ferrero
 Diego García Sayán 
 Roberto Mclean
 Hugo Palma
 Delia Revoredo
 Alejandro san Martin (1936-2005)
 Allan Wagner

External links 
 
 http://www.acuerdodelima.org/docs/19b-alejandro_san_martin.pdf

Research institutes in Peru